The Las Vegas Natural History Museum is a private, nonprofit natural history museum that is located in Downtown Las Vegas, Nevada.  The exhibits focus on various subjects, from dinosaurs, marine life, and mammals both exotic and native, as well as an Egyptian exhibit that opened in February 2010, focusing on the life of Tutankhamen.

The Museum opened on July 16, 1991, and is located on Las Vegas Boulevard across from the Las Vegas Library, as part of the downtown area known as the Cultural Corridor.  It is approximately one mile north of the Fremont Street Experience.

Galleries 
Treasures of Egypt (The former "King Tut" exhibit donated by The Luxor Hotel and Casino)
Las Vegas Founders' African Gallery
Englestad Family Prehistoric Life Gallery
International Wildlife Gallery
Marine Life Gallery
E. L. Weigand Foundation Wild Nevada Gallery
Geology Gallery
Young Scientist Center

References

External links 
 

Natural history museums in Nevada
Museums in Las Vegas
Downtown Las Vegas
Paleontology in Nevada

Dinosaur museums in the United States